Joel Rullis is an Australian former professional rugby league footballer who represented Russia at the 2000 World Cup.

Background
Rullis was born in Australia.

Playing career
Rullis played for Russia in all three matches at the 2000 World Cup. In 2006 he played in two qualifying matches for the 2008 World Cup.

He has played for The Oaks Tigers in the Group 6 Rugby League competition.

References

Living people
Australian rugby league players
Russia national rugby league team players
Rugby league locks
Australian people of Russian descent
Year of birth missing (living people)